Umbonium vestiarium, common name the button tops, is a species of sea snail, a marine gastropod mollusk in the family Trochidae, the top snails.

Description
The solid, rounded shells are up to 2 cm wide. They are similar to Oxystele but are more flattened and show a glossy, highly variable and colourfully patterned exterior.

Habitat
They can be found on eulittoral sand.

Distribution
Indo-Pacific.

Use 
In Vietnam, they are called "ốc ruốc" and commonly sold as a snack.

References

 

Gastropods described in 1758
Taxa named by Carl Linnaeus
vestiarium